Minita Chico-Nazario (December 5, 1939 – February 16, 2022) was an Associate Justice of the Supreme Court of the Philippines. She was appointed to the court by President Gloria Macapagal Arroyo on February 10, 2004.

Profile
Born in San Miguel, Bulacan, Justice Chico-Nazario was the first female justice in the Sandiganbayan and its first female presiding justice.  She was married to Rod Nazario (1935–2009), noted for being the first business manager/promoter of Manny Pacquiao, with whom they had three children: Rhoderick, Rommelious, and Karen.

She finished elementary and high school education at Our Lady of Loreto College, Sampaloc, Manila (1952) and at Our Lady of Loreto College (1956), respectively. She earned her A.B. at the University of the Philippines (1958).

Her appointment to the supreme court was a homecoming of sorts, since she started out as the social secretary of the late Secretary of Justice Juan Liwag after graduating from the University of the Philippines College of Law in 1962.
Justice Nazario was appointed Division Clerk of Court of the Sandiganbayan's First Division and was appointed Regional Trial Court Judge of Biñan, Laguna. Likewise, she was a professor of law at the Perpetual Help University in Las Piñas City (1994–1997). Prior to her appointment to the high court, she had more than 40 years of uninterrupted service in government.

Nazario was latterly the president of the Philippine Women Judges Association and dean of University of Perpetual Help College of Law. She was also the Criminal Law Bar Examiner for the year 2000. Nazario died on February 16, 2022, at the age of 82.

Some notable opinions
 Estrada v. Desierto (2004) — on jurisdiction of Court of Appeals over appeals from Ombudsman decisions
 Nikko Hotel Manila Garden v. Reyes (2005) — on an action for damages filed by comedian Amay Bisaya against Makati hotel
 MMDA v. Garin (2005) — on authority of MMDA to confiscate driver's licenses
 People v. Hon. Tirona (2005) — on right of prosecution to appeal from judgments of acquittal
 People's Journal v. Theonen (2005) – on libel action involving private persons as injured parties
 Province of Rizal v. Executive Secretary (2005) — on closure of San Mateo landfill
 Lambino v. COMELEC (2006) – Dissenting — on people's initiative as a mode to amend the Constitution of the Philippines
 Alvarez v. PICOP (2006) — on conversion of timber license agreements

References

External links
Justice Minita Chico-Nazario (Official Supreme Court Webpage)

1939 births
2022 deaths
Associate Justices of the Supreme Court of the Philippines
20th-century Filipino judges
Filipino women judges
21st-century Filipino judges
People from San Miguel, Bulacan
University of the Philippines alumni
Justices of the Sandiganbayan
21st-century women judges
20th-century women judges